Daniel Joseph O'Sullivan (1927–2013) was an Irish Gaelic footballer who played as a full-forward for the Cork senior team.

Born in Carrigadrohid, County Cork, O'Sullivan first arrived on the inter-county scene at the age of twenty-four when he first linked up with the Cork junior team. He made his senior debut in the 1950 championship. He was a Munster runner-up on two occasions.

At club level, O'Sullivan won one championship medal in the junior grade with Canovee.

Throughout his career O'Sullivan made five championship appearances for Cork. He retired from senior inter-county football following the conclusion of the 1953 championship.

Honours

Canovee
Cork Junior Football Championship (1): 1950

Cork
All-Ireland Junior Football Championship (1): 1955
Munster Junior Football Championship (2): 1953, 1955

References

1927 births
2013 deaths
Cork inter-county Gaelic footballers